Hay-on-Wye, simply known locally as "Hay", is a market town and community in Powys, Wales; it was historically in the county of Brecknockshire. With over twenty bookshops, it is often described as "the town of books"; it is both the National Book Town of Wales and the site of the annual Hay Festival.

The population of the town in 1841 was 1,455; this had grown to 1,680 by 1901. The town has grown little since, with 2018 estimates at 1,900. The built-up area includes Cusop across the border in England and has a population of around 2,000.

Location
The town lies on the south-east bank of the River Wye and is within the north-easternmost tip of the Brecon Beacons National Park, just north of the Black Mountains. The town is just on the Welsh side of the border with Herefordshire, England, here defined by the Dulas Brook. Where the brook joins the River Wye just north of the town, the border continues northwards along the river. The Wye was the boundary between the former counties and districts of Radnorshire and Brecknockshire.

The adjacent village of Cusop lies on the English side of the Dulas Brook.

Etymology
By the 16th century it was simply called Hay, and the use of the river as a suffix is a later addition. The English language name, Hay, is derived from Old English , possibly meaning a "fenced area" and a noun used in late Saxon and Norman times for an enclosure in a forest. The Welsh word  (lenited to ) has a range of meanings, including wooded areas of various extents.

History

Hay-on-Wye, like Builth Wells, has two Norman castles within a short distance of each other. It seems likely that Hay was first fortified by William Fitz Osbern during his penetration of south-east Wales in the summer of 1070, when he defeated three Welsh kings. The history of the site then continues through the lordships of the de Neufmarchés, which was confirmed at the Battle of Brecon in 1093, and also the Gloucester/Hereford families until 1165, when the district of Brycheiniog passed into the hands of the de Braose dynasty of Marcher Lords. In 1230 Hay Castle passed to the de Bohuns and the local history, including the battle near Hay in 1231, is continued through the Mortimer Wars of the 1260s and the battle near Brecon in 1266 down to the death of Earl Humphrey de Bohun in 1298.

First castle
Lying close to St Mary's Church on the western edge of Hay-on-Wye is a small but well-preserved motte. The site overlooks a gorge and small stream, locally known as The Login Brook, that flows into the River Wye, which was undoubtedly one reason for the construction of a motte and bailey castle there. A recently levelled platform under the car park to the northeast may once have housed the castle's bailey. This little fortress was probably the work of William Revel, a knight of Bernard de Neufmarché who is usually referred to as Bernard Newmarch, and may later have been the seat for the manor or commote of Melinog.

Stone castle

The main fortress within Hay-on-Wye was situated on the great site commanding the town and river, under the current ruins of the castle and mansion. The English lordship of Hay passed by marriage to Miles of Gloucester and then into the de Braose family. In the late 11th or early 12th century, a new fortification was built, taking the form of an earth ringwork with a stone gate-tower. It was re-enforced in stone around 1200 with a curtain wall but damaged during the Welsh rebellion led by Owain Glyndŵr around 1401 and in 1460 during the Wars of the Roses. It was then substantially expanded in the 17th century, creating a Jacobean mansion.

Book town

Hay-on-Wye is a destination for bibliophiles in the United Kingdom, with two dozen bookshops, many selling specialist and second-hand books, although the number has declined sharply in recent years, many becoming general antique shops and similar. Hay-on-Wye was already well known for its many bookshops before the festival was launched. Richard Booth opened his first shop there, called The Old Fire Station, in 1962, and by the 1970s Hay had gained the nickname "The Town of Books".

Hay Festival

Since 1988, Hay-on-Wye has been the venue for an annual literary festival, now sponsored by The Daily Telegraph newspaper, which draws a claimed 80,000 visitors over ten days at the end of May or beginning of June to see and hear big literary names from all over the world. Devised by Norman, Rhoda and Peter Florence in 1988, the festival was described by Bill Clinton in 2001 as "The Woodstock of the mind". Tony Benn said: "In my mind it's replaced Christmas". In late July 2021, co-founder and director Peter Florence resigned as Festival Director.

Governance

Hay-on-Wye is a Welsh community with a town council. Its boundary follows the English border/Dulas Brook from the River Wye south-eastwards for just over a kilometre, turns south-west to a point just south of Oakfield house, thence north to Greenpit Farm and north-westwards, enclosing the Hay Showground and meeting the National Park boundary near the B4350, Brecon Road. From this point, it follows the National Park boundary to the River Wye and the river back to the Dulas Brook.

The town council consists of a mayor, deputy mayor and eight councillors.

Hay also participates in the election of a councillor to Powys County Council as part of a larger county division.

Transport

The B4350 runs through the town and the B4351 links it with the main A438 from Brecon to Hereford, on the far side of the River Wye.

The town was formerly served by train services at Hay-on-Wye railway station on the Hereford, Hay and Brecon line ; it closed in 1962 due to the line's commercial underperformance.

Sport
Hay St. Mary's Football Club is based on Hay Sports Field, off Brecon Road, and they compete in the Mid-Wales Football League.

Hay-on-Wye Cricket Club is also located on Hay Sports Field. The 1st team compete in The Marches Cricket League.

Hay Golf Club (now defunct) was founded in 1903. The club continued on its nine-hole course until the onset of World War 2.

Music and philosophy

Hay hosts the philosophy and music festival HowTheLightGetsIn, which occurs annually in Hay-on-Wye in May. HowTheLightGetsIn aims "to get philosophy out of the academy and into people's lives".

Quality of living
Hay-on-Wye was named one of the best places to live in Wales in 2017.

Notable buildings

Hay has nearly 150 listed buildings, including the Castle, St Mary's parish church, St John's chapel, the Ebenezer United Reformed Church, the Swan Hotel, and part of the town wall, as well as many of the town centre inns and shops.

The Butter Market was commissioned by William Enoch and erected in the form of a Doric temple in 1833; the Cheese Market was commissioned by Sir Joseph Bailey, 1st Baronet and completed in 1835.

Oakfield is a Grade II listed Regency house located south of the town centre: built in about 1820, it was recorded in 1842 as the home of Henry Allen Junior.

Hay-on-Wye has a Victorian clock tower which was completed in 1884.

Twinning
Hay-on-Wye is twinned with Redu, a village in the Belgian municipality of Libin, and with Timbuktu, Mali, West Africa.

King of Hay-on-Wye
On 1 April 1977, bibliophile Richard Booth conceived a publicity stunt in which he declared Hay-on-Wye to be an 'independent kingdom' with himself as its monarch and a National Anthem written by Les Penning. The tongue-in-cheek micronation of Hay-on-Wye has subsequently developed a healthy tourism industry based on literary interests for which some credit Booth.  In 2005, Booth announced plans to sell his bookshop and move to Germany; on this occasion local Member of Parliament (MP) Roger Williams was quoted as saying "His legacy will be that Hay changed from a small market town into a mecca for second-hand book lovers and this transformed the local economy".

Notable people

 Herbert Rowse Armstrong (1869–1922), the "Hay Poisoner"; the only UK solicitor to have been hanged for murder
 Richard Booth (1938–2019), self-proclaimed "King of Hay"
 Jason "J" Brown (born 1976), singer in boy band Five
 Penelope Chetwode (1910–1986), Lady Betjeman, author of Two Middle-Aged Ladies in Andalucia
 Christopher Dawson (1889–1970), scholar, wrote books on cultural history and Christendom.
 Jasper Fforde (born 1961), author, the Thursday Next series
 Iain Finlayson (born 1945), writer and journalist.
 Eileen Hutchins (1902-1987), a Steiner school teacher
 George Hay Morgan (1866–1931), politician and MP for Truro 1906 to 1918. 
 Josie Pearson MBE (born 1986), paralympian athlete and Gold Medal winner at the 2012 Paralympic Games
 Sir Terry Pratchett OBE (1948–2015), an English humourist, satirist, and author of fantasy novels
 Jenny Valentine (born 1970), children's novelist, author of Finding Violet Park

See also
 Sedbergh –  the national book town of England
 Wigtown – the national book town of Scotland

References

Further reading
 Remfry, P.M., Hay on Wye Castle, 1066 to 1298

External links

 Official website
 Local tourism website
 Old photographs and history

 
Towns in Powys
Brecknockshire
Antiquarian booksellers
Towns of the Welsh Marches
Market towns in Wales
Bookshops of the United Kingdom
Tourist attractions in Powys
River Wye
Black Mountains, Wales
Bookstore neighborhoods
Communities in Powys